Brianna Knickerbocker is an American voice actress who has provided numerous voices for English dubbed Japanese anime and video games. Some of her roles include Kanao Tsuyuri from Demon Slayer: Kimetsu no Yaiba, Tuesday from Carole & Tuesday, Hu Tao from Genshin Impact, Chisaki Hiradaira from Nagi-Asu: A Lull in the Sea, Tita Russell from The Legend of Heroes: Trails of Cold Steel IV, Sakura from Fire Emblem Fates, and Rem from Re:Zero − Starting Life in Another World. She is also a singer and songwriter known as Starless.

Filmography

Anime

Video games

Live-action dubs

Live-action appearances

Honors and awards
 2015 Staff Choice Award & People's Choice Award for Breakthrough Voice Actress of the Year, 4th Annual BTVA Anime Dub Awards

See also
 List of women in the video game industry

References

External links
 
 
 

Living people
Year of birth missing (living people)
Actresses from Los Angeles
Actresses from Pittsburgh
21st-century American actresses
American video game actresses
Singer-songwriters from Pennsylvania
American women singers
American women singer-songwriters